György Erdélyi (born 31 March 1923, date of death unknown) was a Hungarian swimmer. He competed in the men's 100 metre backstroke at the 1936 Summer Olympics.

References

1923 births
Year of death missing
Hungarian male swimmers
Olympic swimmers of Hungary
Swimmers at the 1936 Summer Olympics
Sportspeople from Eger